The North American Qualification Tournament for the 2000 Men's Olympic Volleyball Tournament was held in Winnipeg, Canada from 5 to 8 January 2000.

Preliminary round

|}

|}

Final

|}

Final standing
{| class="wikitable" style="text-align:center;"
|-
!width=40|Rank
!width=180|Team
|- bgcolor=#ccffcc
|1
|style="text-align:left;"|
|-
|2
|style="text-align:left;"|
|-
|3
|style="text-align:left;"|
|-
|4
|style="text-align:left;"|
|}

External links
Results at Todor66.com

Volleyball Men North America
Olympic Qualification Men North America